Where I Belong is the debut studio album by American country music artist Rachel Proctor. It was released on BNA Records in 2004 as her only studio album to date. Four singles were released from this album between 2003 and 2004: "Days Like This", "Didn't I", "Me and Emily", and the title track. "Me and Emily" was the highest-charting of these four, reaching #18 on the Billboard country charts.

Track listing

Personnel
Tim Akers- keyboards, piano
Tom Bukovac- electric guitar
J.T. Corenflos- electric guitar
Eric Darken- percussion
Larry Franklin- fiddle
Paul Franklin- steel guitar
Kenny Greenburg- electric guitar
Aubrey Haynie- fiddle
Wes Hightower- background vocals
Troy Lancaster- electric guitar
Hillary Lindsey- background vocals
Brent Mason- electric guitar
Kim Parent- background vocals
Rachel Proctor- lead vocals
Karyn Rochelle- background vocals
Jason Sellers- background vocals
Jimmie Lee Sloas- bass guitar
Biff Watson- acoustic guitar
Lonnie Wilson- drums
Glenn Worf- bass guitar
Darryl Worley- background vocals 
Jonathan Yudkin- fiddle

Chart performance

References

2004 debut albums
BNA Records albums
Rachel Proctor albums
Albums produced by Chris Lindsey